An executive agency is a part of a government department that is treated as managerially and budgetarily separate, to carry out some part of the executive functions of the United Kingdom government, Scottish Government, Welsh Government or Northern Ireland Executive. Executive agencies are "machinery of government" devices distinct both from non-ministerial government departments and non-departmental public bodies (or "quangos"), each of which enjoy legal and constitutional separation from ministerial control.  The model has been applied in several other countries.

Size and scope

Agencies include well-known organisations such as His Majesty's Prison Service and the Driver and Vehicle Licensing Agency. The annual budget for each agency, allocated by HM Treasury, ranges from a few million pounds for the smallest agencies to £700m for the Court Service. Virtually all government departments have at least one agency.

Issues and reports

The initial success or otherwise of executive agencies was examined in the Sir Angus Fraser's Fraser Report of 1991. Its main goal was to identify what good practices had emerged from the new model and spread them to other agencies and departments. The report also recommended further powers be devolved from ministers to chief executives.

A series of reports and white papers examining governmental delivery were published throughout the 1990s, under both Conservative and Labour governments. During these the agency model became the standard model for delivering public services in the United Kingdom. By 1997, 76% of civil servants were employed by an agency. The new Labour government in its first such report – the 1998 Next Steps Report – endorsed the model introduced by its predecessor. A later review (in 2002, linked below) made two central conclusions (their emphasis):

The latter point is usually made more forcefully by critics of the government, describing agencies as "unaccountable quangos".

List by department

Cabinet Office 

 Crown Commercial Service

Department for Business, Energy & Industrial Strategy 

 Companies House
 Insolvency Service
 Intellectual Property Office
 Met Office
 UK Space Agency

Department for Levelling Up, Housing and Communities 

 Planning Inspectorate
 Queen Elizabeth II Conference Centre

Department for Digital, Culture, Media & Sport 

 Building Digital UK
 Royal Parks

Department for Education 

 Education and Skills Funding Agency
 Teaching Regulation Agency
 Standards and Testing Agency

Department for Environment, Food & Rural Affairs 

 Animal and Plant Health Agency
 Centre for Environment, Fisheries and Aquaculture Science
 Rural Payments Agency
 Veterinary Medicines Directorate

Department for Transport 

 Driver and Vehicle Licensing Agency
 Driver and Vehicle Standards Agency
 Maritime and Coastguard Agency
 Vehicle Certification Agency

Department of Health and Social Care 

 Medicines and Healthcare products Regulatory Agency
 UK Health Security Agency

Foreign, Commonwealth and Development Office 

 FCDO Services
 Wilton Park

HM Treasury 

 Government Internal Audit Agency
 Debt Management Office

Ministry of Defence 

 Defence Electronics and Components Agency
 Defence Equipment and Support
 Defence Science and Technology Laboratory
 UK Hydrographic Office
 Submarine Delivery Agency

Ministry of Justice 

 Criminal Injuries Compensation Authority
 HM Courts & Tribunals Service
 HM Prison Service
 Legal Aid Agency
 Office of the Public Guardian

Other countries

Several other countries have an executive agency model.

In the United States, the Clinton administration imported the model under the name "performance-based organizations."

In Canada, executive agencies were adopted on a limited basis under the name "special operating agencies." One example is the Translation Bureau under Public Services and Procurement Canada.

Executive agencies were also established in Australia, Jamaica, Japan and Tanzania.

See also
 Trading fund
 Agency of the European Union
 Government-owned corporation
 Departments of the United Kingdom Government
 Non-departmental public body
 Independent agencies of the United States government
 United States federal executive departments

References

External links
Economic Research Council online database of all UK Quangos 1998-2006, archived in 2007
2002 Government report into the agencies model entitled "Better Government Services – Executive agencies in the 21st century" published by The Prime Minister's Office of Public Services Reform. Contains a list of agencies. (PDF)
Civil Service (archived in 2008)

Government of the United Kingdom
Government institutions
Political terminology